The 1972 Davidson Wildcats football team represented Davidson College as a member of the Southern Conference (SoCon) during the 1972 NCAA University Division football season. Led by third-year head coach Dave Fagg, the Wildcats compiled an overall record of 3–7–1 with a mark of 2–3–1 in conference play, placing fifth in the SoCon.

Schedule

References

Davidson
Davidson Wildcats football seasons
Davidson Wildcats football